Kaina Darina Martinez (born 20 February 1986) is a Belizean athlete. She competed in 100 metres at the 2012 Summer Olympics in London. In 2017, she was named one of nine finalist for the NCAA Woman of the Year Award. Martinez was born in the Garifuna village of Seine Bight, Stann Creek District.

Personal bests
100 m: 11.52 s (wind: +1.8 m/s) – Kingsville, Texas, 22 March 2014
200 m: 24.08 s (wind: +2.0 m/s) – Kingsville, Texas, 3 May 2014
Long jump: 5.56 m (wind: +0.0 m/s) – Mayagüez, Puerto Rico, 30 July 2010

Achievements

References

External links

Athlete profile at London2012

1986 births
Living people
People from Stann Creek District
Garifuna people
Belizean female sprinters
Olympic athletes of Belize
Athletes (track and field) at the 2012 Summer Olympics
Pan American Games competitors for Belize
Athletes (track and field) at the 2007 Pan American Games
Athletes (track and field) at the 2015 Pan American Games
Commonwealth Games competitors for Belize
Athletes (track and field) at the 2010 Commonwealth Games
Athletes (track and field) at the 2014 Commonwealth Games
World Athletics Championships athletes for Belize
Central American Games gold medalists for Belize
Central American Games medalists in athletics
Central American Games silver medalists for Belize
Olympic female sprinters